The 2016 Pacific Rugby League International was again split into two games. The first was the Melanesian Cup between Papua New Guinea and Fiji. The second was the Polynesian Cup between Samoa and  Tonga.

Results

ANZAC Test

The 2016 Anzac Test was a rugby league test match played between Australia and New Zealand at Hunter Stadium in Newcastle. It was the 17th Anzac Test played between the two nations since the first was played under the Super League banner in 1997.

The game marked the international coaching debut of Mal Meninga for Australia since taking over the position from Tim Sheens in late 2015. Meninga, a 4 time Kangaroo Tourist (the only player ever to do so), a World Cup winning captain and a veteran of 46 tests for Australia between 1982–94, has previously coached Queensland to 9 State of Origin series wins in 10 years (including a record 8 series wins in succession from 2006-2013) in the years prior to taking over as Kangaroos coach.

This was the first of two matches between Australia and New Zealand before the 2016 Rugby League Four Nations in late October and November. The second match will be played at the nib Stadium in Perth, Western Australia on 15 October.

Meninga broke tradition and named the Australian team a few days early, which included 4 debutants; Blake Ferguson, Josh McGuire, Michael Morgan and Fijian-born Semi Radradra.

The New Zealand team was named on 1 May.

Melanesian Cup

The 2016 Melanesian Cup was played between Papua New Guinea and Fiji.

Papua New Guinea created history to win their first Melanesian Cup title. The test looked in a similar situation to last year when Fiji took a comfortable lead into the break but this time around Papua New Guinea scored enough points in the second half to outscore their pacific rivals and win their first major title since the 2009 Pacific Cup. Captain David Mead shone for the Kumuls as he made try-saving tackles, assists and even line breaks in a man-of-the-match performance which was a crucial influence to earning his country's first win on away soil since the year 2000.

Fiji picked 7 débutantes for the test match, while PNG featured five players making their first ever International appearance for their country. Both teams had a fair share of NRL, Queensland or New South Wales Cup, as well as domestic club players. Papua New Guinea's most capped player was Rod Griffin who made his 10th appearance for his country, while Fiji's most experienced player was Akuila Uate who made his 12th appearance for his country.

Gold Coast's David Mead captained Papua New Guinea, and Port Kembla Blacks' James Storer led Fiji.

Match details

Polynesian Cup

The 2016 Polynesian Cup was played between Samoa and Tonga.

Samoa defeated Tonga to win their second consecutive Polynesian Cup title. The strong crowd would always show their passion and loud screaming support throughout the game after big hits, strong runs and intense moments were key talking points. However a total of 29 errors and a completion rate of just over 50% from both countries was a headache for everyone to watch. Despite Tonga having 55% possession and more territory, they didn't score and the Samoans made them pay by taking their few second-half opportunities that were given to them resulting in another Samoan victory over their old 'War rivals'.

Samoa picked 7 débutantes for the test match, while Tonga featured three. Both teams' players varied from National Rugby League players to Queensland or New South Wales Cup to Holden Cup and to the Super League. Samoa's most capped player was Leeson Ah Mau who made his 10th appearance for his country, while Tonga's most experienced player was Feleti Mateo who made his 13th appearance for his country.

English Super League club Hull F.C. gave permission for two players to leave England and play in the Polynesian Cup test; coincidentally they were captain of both nations.  Frank Pritchard captained Samoa, and Sika Manu led Tonga.

Match details

Cook Islands vs Lebanon
Another Pacific Island nation that does not compete in these matches, Cook Islands, organised a test match with Lebanon at Belmore Sports Ground on May 8.

October Games

Samoa vs Fiji
A couple of hours before the Pacific test-matches began, discussions were made and confirmed between the RLIF Deputy Chairman, John Grant, alongside Rugby League Samoa Chairman/Asia-Pacific Rugby League Confederation Chairman, Tagaloa Faafouina Su'a, and the Fiji Rugby League Chairman, Filimoni Vosarogo, that Samoa's city of Apia will host a test-match between Samoa and Fiji on October 8, 2016. This test-match will mark 30 years of Rugby league in Samoa.

Australia vs New Zealand

Vanuatu vs Solomon Islands

References

Pacific Rugby League International
Rugby league in Sydney
2018 in Fijian sport
2018 in Tongan sport
2018 in Papua New Guinea rugby league
2018 in Samoan sport